Večerníček (meaning "little bedtime story" Czech and Slovak) is a television program for children in the Czech Republic and Slovakia.  It has been broadcast regularly for over 50 years.  Before the dissolution of Czechoslovakia in 1993, two versions – one in Czech and one in Slovak – were aired in the respective parts of Czechoslovakia. Similar shows in other European countries include Sandmännchen in Germany, Esti mese in Hungary and Wieczorynka in Poland.

Currently, Večerníček is aired in the Czech Republic at 18:45 every day, when children are expected to go to sleep.  The show (opening theme, tale, closing theme) lasts maximally ten minutes.  Every tale takes 5–8 minutes.  A full Večerníček series typically contains 10 – 20 episodes (with the exception of Pat & Mat).

The format of the program has been unchanged for decades, making it part of the Czech and Slovak culture.

Opening and closing themes

In the Czech Republic, the program's opening and final themes feature a little boy called Večerníček (a boy wearing a newspaper hat, black t-shirt and orange pants) as he throws paper while walking up stairs and falls. After that, he rides a rocking horse, which turns into a car, and then finally into a unicycle and then the last paper with the Czech Television logo going straight to the screen with “Vecernicek” appearing. At the beginning of the program, the boy says "Good Evening" (Dobrý večer in Czech) to the children watching; at the end, he says "Good Night" (Dobrou noc).  This is the longest-running opening and closing theme ever broadcast in the country.  The graphics were designed by Radek Pilař (the animation provided by Bratri v Triku, an animation company of Kratky Film Prague) and the music was provided by Ladislav Simon.

In Slovakia, the program's opening and final themes feature an old man called "Grandpa Večerníček", who had his own Večerníček series in the 1980s.  Thought to be a shepherd, Grandpa Večerníček lives in a house on a hill with his dog, who lives in a kennel.  The old man, accompanied by the dog, "switches on" the stars in the sky, using a lamplighter's pole.  During the closing theme, Grandpa Večerníček and the dog return to their house and kennel.  Like the Czech Republic's, this is the longest-running opening and closing theme ever broadcast in Slovakia.  Its original version has been revamped, with the addition of better colors, as well as a cat.

History of the program
On January 2, 1965, a program named Večerníček appeared on Czechoslovakian television.  The current opening and closing themes were introduced in summer of 1965.

In Slovakia, the program's original name was "Good Night Story" (Rozprávka na dobrú noc).  It is unclear whether the current opening and closing themes started in 1965 or 1966.

Milan Nápravník designed the show's concept and was the first dramaturgist of the Czech version.  Since 1973, Večerníček has been shown in color.

Practically all famous Czech and Slovak illustrators, writers, animators, and directors, such as Václav Čtvrtek (author of Víla Amálka), have participated in the program.

After 1989, Večerníček survived several attempts to change its themes and even cancel the program.

Schedule
Until 1976, the Czech version of the program saw frequent changes of scheduling.  It was broadcast on a variety of days over the years.

From January 1976 – 2012, Večerníček was broadcast every day on ČT1, the first Czech national television channel.  The channel would show one full series continuously for a block of days.  Several attempts were made to broadcast the same or different series on ČT2, the second national television channel.

Since 2012, Večerníček has been broadcast on ČT2 instead of ČT1.  Fans of the show are worried about the whole program being definitively cancelled, since this would lead to viewers' transition to foreign children's cartoons.

Website
A Večerníček website was founded by Robert Štípek in 2005.  It was designed to be a specialized database, providing a complete history of the program.

Trivia
 Asteroid 33377 Večerníček, discovered by Petr Pravec at Ondřejov Observatory on 12 February 1999, was named after the animated boy. 
 The Ministry of Industry and Trade of the Czech Republic issued a stamp on 18 February 2015 to celebrate the 50th anniversary of the program, along with a First Day Cover.

References

External links
 Opening and final themes:
Czech version: 
Slovak version: winter (old version), summer (old version), spring (new version)
 Article about the Czech programme
 History of Večerníček on Czech TV (in Czech)
  Online database covering the whole history of Večerníček (in Czech)

1960s Czechoslovak television series
1970s Czechoslovak television series
1980s Czechoslovak television series
2010s Czech television series
2010s Slovak television series
Czech children's television series
Slovak television series
Czech Television original programming